Ornithacris   is a genus of grasshoppers in the subfamily Cyrtacanthacridinae.  These are large insects, recognisable by their brightly coloured wings when caught: although they are difficult to catch being strong fliers.  
Species are found throughout Africa, south of the Sahara and may be moderately significant to minor agricultural pests.

Species 
The Orthoptera Species File lists:
Ornithacris cavroisi Finot, 1907
Ornithacris cyanea Stoll, 1813 - type species (as Gryllus cyaneus Stoll, C. = O. cyanea cyanea); synonym Ornithacris imperialis Rehn, 1943
Ornithacris pictula Walker, 1870
Ornithacris turbida Walker, 1870

References

External links 
 
 

Acrididae genera
Cyrtacanthacridinae
Orthoptera of Africa
Taxa named by Boris Uvarov